Robinin is a chemical compound. It can be isolated from Vinca erecta or from the common locust Robinia pseudoacacia. It is a flavone glycoside based on kaempferol.

References 

Kaempferol glycosides